This was the first edition of the tournament.

Fernando Romboli and Eduardo Schwank won in the final against Marcelo Arévalo and Nicolás Barrientos 6–7(6–8), 6–4, [10–8]

Seeds

Draw

Draw

References

External links 
 Draw

São Paulo Challenger de Tenis - Men's Doubles
Tennis tournaments in Brazil